Blackbird is a 2014 drama film directed by Patrik-Ian Polk and starring Mo'Nique and Isaiah Washington. The film is adapted from the novel of the same name by Larry Duplechan and was released theatrically on April 24, 2015.

Premise
A gay teenager in high school in a small Baptist town in Mississippi struggles with his religion and his sexuality. To make matters worse, his younger sister has been missing for years and it is tearing his family apart.

Cast 
 Julian Walker as Randy Rousseau
 Mo'Nique as Claire Rousseau
 Isaiah Washington as Lance Rousseau
 Kevin Allesee as Marshall MacNeil
 Terrell Tilford as Pastor Crandall
D. Woods as Leslie Crandall
 Gary LeRoi Gray as Efrem
 Torrey Laamar as Todd Waterson
 Nikki Jane as Crystal

Background 
Polk initially tried to get the film made several years earlier, with Jussie Smollett cast as the young lead, however financing fell through. When the funding came through years later, he was forced to re-cast because of Smollett's busy schedule on Empire, and struggled to find a black male actor who would portray a gay love story on screen. However, he later met Julian Walker, who is openly gay, and chose to cast him despite his lack of acting experience.

Polk discussed, in an interview with BuzzFeed, the need for more stories featuring gay men who aren't white: Through my years of filmmaking, we have seen the gay coming-of-age story from every possible white male point of view ... We’ve seen it over, and over, and over.

Release 
The film had a successful run on the film festival circuit, winning awards at several LGBT-oriented festivals including Outflix Memphis, Atlanta’s Out On Film Festival, and the Crossroads Film Festival in Polk’s native Mississippi. The film was the closing night gala screening for Los Angeles’ Pan African Film Festival (PAFF), where it won the Founders Award for Best Narrative Feature Film.

Reception 
Blackbird received mixed to negative reviews from critics. , 40% of the ten reviews compiled on Rotten Tomatoes are positive, with an average rating of 4.6/10. The Hollywood Reporter called it "too all over the map to take seriously". The New York Times said that the film has an "impressive, palpable conviction", although it ultimately "suffers from soapy excesses and narrative disjunctures". Slant Magazine wrote: "Blackbird is, like its main character, too naïve to understand or, at least, to deploy the reparative powers of camp".

See also
List of black films of the 2010s

References

External links
 

2014 films
African-American drama films
African-American LGBT-related films
American LGBT-related films
American independent films
Films directed by Patrik-Ian Polk
Gay-related films
Films about interracial romance
2014 LGBT-related films
LGBT-related drama films
2014 drama films
2014 independent films
2010s English-language films
2010s American films